The following list of Carnegie libraries in Michigan provides detailed information on United States Carnegie libraries in Michigan, where 61 libraries were built from 53 grants (totaling $1,655,950) awarded by the Carnegie Corporation of New York from 1901 to 1918.

Key

Carnegie libraries

Notes

References

Note: The above references, while all authoritative, are not entirely mutually consistent. Some details of this list may have been drawn from one of the references without support from the others.  Reader discretion is advised.

Michigan
Libraries
 
Libraries